Mirza Muhammad Baqir Sharif Tabatabaei (Moḥammad Baqer Hamadani; 1823–1901) was an Iranian Islamic scholar.

Biography 
Mirza Muhammad Baqir was born in a village named Qehi in the vicinity of Isfahan.
His father, Mulla Muhammad Jafar was an admirer of Sheikh Ahmad Ahsaei Ala Maqami. After learning the basics from his father, Mirza Muhammad Baqir travelled to Isfahan to continue his education, and resided in Nimavard School where he studied different sciences for several years. Then he met one of the admirers of Haj Muhammad Karim Kermani, (who was also known as “Badr”). Since Kermani was on a pilgrimage to Imam Reza's shrine in Mashhad through Yazd, he travelled to Yazd in the hope of visiting the great man in 1261 Hijri year.
Since the path was dangerous, and Kermani had to return to Kerman, Mirza Muhammad Baqir accompanied him to Kerman, and resided in Ibrahimieh School, studying Islamic theology.
In a short time he had reached a level where he could teach the lessons of his grand master.
After several years, the date of which is not known, Kermani sent him to the city of Naein for preaching and guidance, where he spent some years preaching and proselytizing.
Mirza Muhammad Baqir immediately gained the attention and respect of the Sheikhieh members of Nain, Anarak, Jandaq, Biabanak and the surrounding cities.Then he returned to Kerman, Until Kermani left for a pilgrimage to Karbala in 1283 Hijri year. When Kermani arrived in Hamedan, because of the great number of Sheikhieh adherents, and also lack of great leaders after the demise of Mullah Abdulsamad Hamedani, he appointed Mirza Muhammad Baqir as a leader in his absence, and continued his pilgrimage to Karbala.
Mirza Muhammad Baqir stayed in Hamedan since his mentor had mandated it. He engaged in preaching, proselytizing and teaching Islamic principles for 32 years. He was a great leader and protector for the Sheikhieh members after the demise of his mentor, until 1315 Hijri. In Eid al-Fitr of 1315, when the riots of Hamedan occurred, he migrated to Jandaq village and stayed there for the rest of his fruitful life, teaching Islamic principles and preaching.
Mirza Muhammad Baqir died on the 23rd of Sha’ban 1319, at the age of 80. After Maqrib and Isha prayer.
This great man was buried in the same village, but after two years, his body was moved to Mashhad, to be laid to rest in Imam Reza's shrine, next to his Imam. He has left more than 190 manuscripts and almost 2000 sermons and teachings.

Mohammad Ibrahim, the third son of Mohammad Baqir Sabzavari, migrated to Qehi village for some reasons during the Safavid period (probably during the Afghan sedition, when the murder, looting, and cruel killing of the innocent people of Esfahan, especially the scholars and the Taliban of Shi'a) Settled at the end of the western western village. The castle, which dates back a long time, is one of the village's main buildings and seven houses. These seven houses are surrounded by a long wall and seven adorned towers, seven meters high. Several generations of descendants of Mohammad Baqir Mohaqeq Sabzewari lived in this castle. Hence, they are known as castle families. Later she selected Ashrafi, Bagheri and Bagheri scholars

Education 
The passion for science and learning led him to meet Hajj Mohammad Karim Kermani. When he heard the visit of Hajj Mohammad Karim from Yazd to Mashhad, he was eagerly on his way. Because Hajj Mohammad Karim Kermani's visit was canceled, he went to Kerman with him and settled in Ibrahimya school. In summary, many years in Anjang and Kerman, in the presence of him, earned his grace for grace, until he was sent to the direction of guidance and guidance of the Nahinites; and after several years he returned to Kerman and continued to study with his teacher.
He returned to Hamedan with the orders of the professor and the people of Hamedan and asked to publish the Ahlul-Bayt's facts. As long as in 1288, Hajj Mohammad Karim Kermani broke the world and some of his students who knew the knowledge and hardship of Haj Muhammad Baqir came to Nahrzad and came through Hamadan. Until the jealousy of his jealousy was burned in that day, and finally in Eid al-Fitr in 1315 AD. They attacked the Shaikhis of Hamedan, which killed some of its circle members and their emigration and their families to Ray and then to a village in the desert called Jandagh.

Death 
Mirza Muhammad Baqir died on the night of January 23. Later, the body was transported to Mashhad, and buried near Ali ibn Musa al-Reza in the new courtyard (Azadi) room number 3, which is now located at the entrance to the Darul-e Hakmah's porch.

References 

Shia clerics from Isfahan
Iranian Shia scholars of Islam
1823 births
1901 deaths
Burials at Imam Reza Shrine